Qikiqtaarjuk (ᕿᑭᖅᑖᕐᔪᒃ) formerly Deer Island is one of the uninhabited Canadian Arctic islands in the Qikiqtaaluk Region, Nunavut, Canada. The island is located in Foxe Basin just north of Kapuiviit.

References

Islands of Foxe Basin
Uninhabited islands of Qikiqtaaluk Region